Point Historic District is a national historic district located at Logansport, Cass County, Indiana. The district encompasses 34 contributing buildings, 2 contributing sites, and 1 contributing structure in the heart of the oldest section of Logansport.  It has a mix of residential and commercial buildings and notable examples of Queen Anne and Colonial Revival style residential architecture. Notable contributing resources include the Urban Point Park (c. 1940), Firestone Station (1928), All Saints Rectory (c. 1925), St. Joseph's (now All Saints) Roman Catholic Church (1884), Geiger Building (1889), and St. Luke's English Evangelical Lutheran Church (1908).

It was listed on the National Register of Historic Places in 1999.

References

Historic districts on the National Register of Historic Places in Indiana
Queen Anne architecture in Indiana
Colonial Revival architecture in Indiana
Historic districts in Cass County, Indiana
National Register of Historic Places in Cass County, Indiana
Logansport, Indiana